Starter Wives Confidential is an American reality television series on TLC. The series premiered on January 29, 2013 at 10pm ET/PT. Starter Wives Confidential follows the lives of seven women who had relationships with men prior to the wealth and stardom making them what they are today. It would later be canceled due to low ratings.

Cast
 Cheryl Caruso: Caruso was married to Phillip Caruso and have two children together.
 Josie Harris: Harris is a previous girlfriend of Floyd Mayweather and have three children together.
 Liza Morales: Morales is a previous girlfriend of Lamar Odom and have three children together.
 Zakia Baum: Baum is a previous girlfriend of Jermaine "Maino" Coleman and have one son together.
 Shaniqua Tompkins: Tompkins is a previous girlfriend of Curtis "50 Cent" Jackson and have one son together.
 Monica Joseph-Taylor: Taylor was married to Funkmaster Flex and have two children together.
 Tashera Simmons: Simmons was married to Earl "DMX" Simmons and have four children together.

Episodes

References

2010s American reality television series
2013 American television series debuts
2013 American television series endings
English-language television shows
TLC (TV network) original programming